Cansei (I'm tired) was a protest-movement organized by high-profile society in Brazil about lack of ethics in politics and government in Mensalão scandal and 2006–2007 Brazilian aviation crisis. Cansei failed to get large appeal.

Members

Personalities 
The members of "Cansei" are popularly known as "cansados" (the tired ones). Below follows a list of members as published in the official page of the organization:

 Ana Maria Braga, TV hostess
 Zezé di Camargo, singer and songwriter
 Hebe Camargo, TV hostess
 Tom Cavalcante, comedian
 Gabriel Chalita, former secretary of education of São Paulo
 Lafaiete Coutinho, former president of Banco do Brasil
 João Doria Jr., journalist, businessman and TV host
 Regina Duarte, actress
 Victor Fasano, actor
 Moacyr Franco, actor
 Lars and Torben Grael, sailors
 Léo Jaime, singer and songwriter
 Seu Jorge, singer and songwriter

 Adriana Lessa, actress
 Luana Piovani, model and actress
 Silvia Poppovic, TV hostess
 Irene Ravache, actress
 Agnaldo Rayol, singer
 Sérgio Reis, singer
 Jair Rodrigues, singer
 Patrícia Rollo, business woman
 Ivete Sangalo, singer
 Beatriz Segall, actress
 Fernando Scherer, swimmer
 Beth Szafir, business woman
 Christiane Torloni, actress
 Paulo Vilhena, actor
 Wanderléa, singer
 Paulo Zottolo, former president of Philips in Brazil.

Confused as member
Daniela Mercury, singer and songwriter. Mercury's involvement with "Cansei" was denied by the newspaper Folha de S.Paulo.

Organizations 
By July, 2007, 63 organizations were affiliated with Cansei. Among them, the OAB sections of São Paulo, Distrito Federal and Mato Grosso do Sul, the Regional Council of Engineers and Architects, the Brazilian Association of Odontology, the ABERT, the Federation of the Industries of São Paulo, the Regional Council of Medicine, the Brazilian Alliance for Organ and Tissue Donations, the Association of Military Police Officers of São Paulo, among others.

References

Political movements in Brazil